Alex Bradley III (born October 30, 1959) is an American retired professional basketball player. He played for the Villanova Wildcats from 1977 to 1981 and for the New York Knicks in the NBA during the 1981–82 NBA season.

Early life 
Born in Bradenton, Florida, Bradley played high school basketball for Long Branch High School in Long Branch, New Jersey.

Career

College 
Bradley played collegiately for the Villanova Wildcats from 1977 to 1981. Bradley set the single-game freshman scoring record in 1978, a record remained in place until it was broken by Scottie Reynolds in 2007. Bradley was the first three-year captain at Villanova since 1952. He was selected for the 1981 Big East All-Tournament Team. He led the Wildcats to three NCAA Tournament appearances.

NBA 
Bradley played in the NBA for the New York Knicks during the 1981–82 NBA season.

Personal life 
Bradley married future Delaware congresswoman Lisa Blunt, whom he met at Villanova, in the 1980s. They have two children together and divorced in 2003.

References

External links
College & NBA stats @ basketballreference.com

1959 births
Living people
American expatriate basketball people in Belgium
American expatriate basketball people in France
American expatriate basketball people in Italy
American expatriate basketball people in Spain
American men's basketball players
Basketball players from Florida
Basketball players from New Jersey
CB Valladolid players
Liga ACB players
Long Branch High School alumni
New York Knicks draft picks
New York Knicks players
Sportspeople from Bradenton, Florida
Sportspeople from Long Branch, New Jersey
Villanova Wildcats men's basketball players
Small forwards